Joseph Betino (born 27 August 1966) is a Ghanaian politician and a member Eighth Parliament of the Fourth Republic of Ghana representing Suaman Constituency in the Western North Region. He became a member of parliament on the ticket of the National Democratic Congress.

Early life and education 
He comes from Nandom and was born on the 27th of August 1966. In 1990, Betino had his A level education.

Politics 
Betino was formerly the District Chief Executive for the Suaman Constituency. He contested and won the NDC Parliamentary Primaries at Suaman Constituency to become the party's candidate for the December 2020 election. He pulled 8900 votes representing 51.2% of the total vote to win.

Committees 
He serves as a member of the standing Order Committee of parliament and the  Food, Agriculture and Cocoa affairs Committee.

Personal life 
He is a Christian.

References 

Living people
Ghanaian MPs 2021–2025
1966 births